Paattinte Palazhy is a 2010 Malayalam film directed by Rajeev Anchal. The film has Meera Jasmine and Revathy in lead roles. Manoj.K.Jayan and Jagathy Sreekumar also play prominent roles in this film. Meera plays the role of a playback singer in the film.

Jagathy Sreekumar plays the father to Meera's character. Nedumudi Venu plays a full-length role in this film. The movie featured six songs written by veteran poet O.N.V. Kurup. The music was being produced by Dr. Suresh Manimala, a debutant in the film industry.

Plot 
Veena (Meera Jasmine) aspires to become a world-renowned singer. When she realizes that the music within her has no ways of flowing out, she is driven almost to madness, but eventually finds a way to express it. Her father Sheshadri, Guru Usthad, Aamir, Dr. Aparna, Ganapathi, and young music director Sreehari compete for their share of her voice. With their help, she finds the best way to share her music.

Cast
 Meera Jasmine as Veena
 Manoj K. Jayan as Ameer
 Revathi as Dr. Aparna
 Jagathy Sreekumar as Seshadri
 Balabhaskar (voice dubbed by sarath )
 Nedumudi Venu as Usthad Ameer
 Krishna Kumar
 Prem Kumar
 Sooraj Fasiluddin(guest role)
 Shomy Easow as Sunny
 Saji Sadasivan

Production
The filming was started on 2 January 2010. Major parts were shot from Coorg and Chennai.

Soundtrack
The film features a soundtrack written by veteran poet O. N. V. Kurup and composed by the debutant Dr. Suresh Manimala.

References
 Suresh Manimala at MSI

External links
 

 http://www.nowrunning.com/movie/7208/malayalam/pattinte-palazhy/index.htm
 https://web.archive.org/web/20120612030942/http://popcorn.oneindia.in/title/7226/pattinte-palazhi.html

2010s Malayalam-language films
2010 films
Films scored by Balabhaskar